Armin-Wolf-Arena is a baseball stadium located in Regensburg, Germany. It was built in 1996 and has a capacity of 3,100 spectators. It hosts the home games of Buchbinder Legionäre Regensburg of the Bundesliga Baseball and has hosted the 2009 Baseball World Cup and the German qualifying round of the 2013 and 2023 editions of the World Baseball Classic.

See also
2013 World Baseball Classic
2023 World Baseball Classic

References

Baseball in Germany
Baseball venues in Europe
Sport in Regensburg
Buildings and structures in Regensburg
Sports venues in Bavaria